Linda Fäh (born 10 November 1987) is a Swiss singer, model and beauty pageant titleholder. She won the Miss Switzerland title in 2009. Although Fäh was a favorite for 2010 Miss Universe pageant, she failed to place.
As an attempt to start her musical career, Linda released an album in September 2015 under the label Telamo (Warner). The album is titled "Du Kannst Fliegen" (meaning "You Can Fly").

References

External links
Miss Switzerland Official Website

1987 births
Living people
Miss Universe 2010 contestants
People from St. Gallen (city)
Miss Switzerland winners
Swiss beauty pageant winners
Swiss female models